Thanasis Pindonis (born 24 March 1986) is a Greek professional footballer who plays as a defensive midfielder for Super League 2 club Doxa Drama.

External links
 Myplayer Profile
 Crimson Scorer
 Interview-On Sports

1986 births
Living people
Greek footballers
Association football midfielders
Kallithea F.C. players
Anagennisi Deryneia FC players
Doxa Drama F.C. players
Athlitiki Enosi Larissa F.C. players
Panachaiki F.C. players
Expatriate footballers in Cyprus
Cypriot First Division players
Greek expatriate footballers
Greek expatriate sportspeople in Cyprus
Footballers from Drama, Greece